Coppa or COPPA may refer to:

 Capocollo, or coppa, a type of traditional Italian pork cold cut
 Montonico bianco, a white Italian wine grape variety grown in the Calabria region of southern Italy
 Giovanni Coppa (1925–2016), Italian cardinal
 Christine Coppa, American writer
 Coppa Italia, a domestic Italian league cup
 Children's Online Privacy Protection Act (COPPA), a United States federal cyber law

See also 
 Council of Parent Attorneys and Advocates (COPAA)
 Koppa (disambiguation)
 Copper (disambiguation)